St Mary's Church is a church in Barwell, Leicestershire. It is a Grade I listed building.

History
The church dates back to circa 1300–50. It consists of a 4-bay nave, north and south porch, north and south aisle and a tower containing 4 bells. The church was restored twice in the 19th century, in 1854 by "H. Goddard" (presumably the Leicester architect Henry Goddard), and in 1877.

References

Barwell
Barwell